Clostridium butyricum is a strictly anaerobic endospore-forming Gram-positive butyric acid–producing bacillus subsisting by means of fermentation using an intracellularly accumulated amylopectin-like α-polyglucan (granulose) as a substrate. It is uncommonly reported as a human pathogen and is widely used as a probiotic in Asia (particularly in Japan, Korea and China). C. butyricum is a soil inhabitant in various parts of the world, has been cultured from the stool of healthy children and adults, and is common in soured milk and cheeses. The connection with dairy products is shown by the name: the butyr- in butyricum reflects the relevance of butyric acid in the bacteria's metabolism and the connection with Latin butyrum and Greek βούτυρον, with word roots pertaining to butter and cheese.

Industrial relevance
The study of fermentation in the 19th century was of interest not only to basic science but also as applied science funded by companies in certain industries, principally winemaking and brewing, as a means to reduce risk of bad batches through greater understanding and control of the process. Thus early microbiologists such as Louis Pasteur were funded in their research into microbial metabolism and biochemistry. Such research led to the first understanding of anaerobic metabolism, and butyric acid fermentation was humans' initial window into that world. In this connection it was circa 1880 when a scientist surnamed Prazmowski first assigned a name to Clostridium butyricum.

Therapeutic uses
The first C. butyricum MIYAIRI strain was isolated from the feces of Dr. Chikaji Miyairi in Japan in 1933, and CBM 588 is the 588th MIYAIRI strain, isolated from a soil sample in Nagano, Japan, in 1963. Preparations based on CBM 588 have a long history of safe use in human populations in Asia, especially Japan, where such products are variously classed as pharmaceutical drugs, "quasi drugs", and OTC (Over The Counter) probiotics. The safe history of CBM 588 in human Asian populations is supported by various peer-reviewed publications and case studies dating back to 1963, including reports of CBM 588 use in severely-ill, immune-compromised and hospitalized patients, whose ages range from infants to elderly people, and include pregnant women.

Its usefulness stems primarily from its ability to interfere with the growth of highly pathogenic Clostridium difficile by antagonizing its multiplication. It is often used in Japanese hospitals for C. difficile prophylaxis among in-patients and, particularly, during administration of certain powerful antibiotics (i.e.: Levofloxacin) associated with opportunistic C. difficile infection.

CBM 588 was approved for clinical use in humans by the Japanese Ministry of Health and Welfare in 1970. The standard preparation as marketed by Miyarisan Pharmaceutical (Tokyo, Japan) consists of white, marked tablets each containing 0.35 × 106 colony forming units (CFU) of C. butyricum MIYAIRI 588 (as active agent). CBM 588 does not establish permanently in the gut, in common with other orally administered probiotic bacteria. CBM 588 for clinical use is produced by submerged anaerobic fermentation followed by centrifugation, drying, blending and packaging.

The MIYAIRI 588 strain of C. butyricum does not carry any genes encoding any toxins and virulence factors associated with Clostridium or other enteropathogens. Absence of neurotoxin production has been demonstrated by polymerase chain reaction (PCR) and Southern blot hybridisation for type E botulinum toxin gene. The absence of genes encoding botulinum neurotoxin A,B,F and genes encoding non-toxic haemagglutinin (NTNH) and genes encoding Clostridium perfringens toxins (alpha, beta, epsilon and iota) has been demonstrated by PCR assay.

This strain is deposited at the Fermentation Research Institute, Agency of Industrial Science and Technology, Japan under the strain name Clostridium butyricum MIYAIRI 588 strain, deposit number FERM BP-2789. Recent European Food Safety Authority opinions confirm the official strain nomenclature as Clostridium butyricum FERM BP-2789.

Sources

References

External links
 Clostridium butyricum at BacDive

Gram-positive bacteria
Probiotics
butyricum